Anthony Jahnke (December 5, 1879 – December 12, 1953) was an American gymnast. He competed in three events at the 1904 Summer Olympics.

References

External links
 

1879 births
1953 deaths
American male artistic gymnasts
Olympic gymnasts of the United States
Gymnasts at the 1904 Summer Olympics
People from Świecie
20th-century American people
Emigrants from the German Empire to the United States